Giorgi Tsereteli may refer to:

 Giorgi Tsereteli (orientalist) (1904–1973), Georgian orientalist
 Giorgi Tsereteli (writer) (1842–1900), Georgian writer
 Gigi Tsereteli (born 1964), Georgian politician